Honolulu, the capital of Hawaii, is a U.S. city.

The first high-rise that exceeded 350 ft was the Ala Moana Hotel built in 1970. The next high-rise was the Yacht Harbor Towers followed by the Hawaii Monarch Hotel and the Discovery Bay Center. This was the beginning of the construction boom in the city. At the same time business and finance also boomed. During the 1990s new Residentials were built, including the One Waterfront Mauka Tower, Imperial Plaza, Nauru Tower and the Hawaiki Tower.

Tallest buildings
This includes spires and architectural details but does not include antenna masts.

Tallest buildings approved or under construction

Gallery

See also
List of tallest buildings in Oceania

References

Honolulu
 
Tallest